Sir Michael Sanigear Williams, KCMG (17 August 1911 – 25 February 1984) was a British diplomat.

Michael Williams was educated at Rugby School and Trinity College, Cambridge. He entered the Foreign Office in 1935 and served in the British embassies at Madrid, Rome, and Rio de Janeiro besides posts in London.

Williams was Minister at Bonn 1956–60; Minister to Guatemala 1960–62 and Ambassador to Guatemala 1962–63; Assistant Under-Secretary of State, Foreign Office, 1963–65; and finally Envoy Extraordinary and Minister Plenipotentiary to the Holy See 1965–70.

Williams was appointed CMG in 1954 and knighted KCMG in 1968.

See also
British Ambassadors to the Holy See.

References
WILLIAMS, Sir Michael (Sanigear), Who Was Who, A & C Black, 1920–2008; online edn, Oxford University Press, Dec 2007, accessed 18 Feb 2012

1911 births
1984 deaths
People educated at Rugby School
Alumni of Trinity College, Cambridge
Knights Commander of the Order of St Michael and St George
Ambassadors of the United Kingdom to Guatemala
Ambassadors of the United Kingdom to the Holy See